The 2015 Anchorage mayoral election was held on April 7 and May 5, 2015, to elect the mayor of Anchorage, Alaska. It saw election of Ethan Berkowitz.

Since no candidate obtained a 45% plurality in the first round, a runoff was held between the top-two finishers.

Results

First round

Runoff

References

See also

Anchorage
Anchorage
2015